Lipovtsy is an urban locality (an urban-type settlement)  in Oktyabrsky District, Primorsky Krai, Russia. Population:

References

Urban-type settlements in Primorsky Krai